Budralazine (INN) is a vasodilator.

References 

Phthalazines
Hydrazines